Lower Shellburg Falls is located in Santiam State Forest, Oregon, United States.The Waterfall is 40 feet tall. It is located near two other waterfalls: Shellburg Falls and Stasel Falls. Shellburg Creek supplies the waterfall.

References

Waterfalls of Oregon
Bodies of water of Marion County, Oregon